Greenhead may refer to:

Placenames
Greenhead (Wishaw), Scotland
Greenhead, Northumberland, England
Greenhead, Scottish Borders, Scotland
Greenhead, Staffordshire, England
Greenhead College, a sixth form college in Huddersfield, England

Other
Greenhead fly, a fly in the family Tabanidae family often considered a pest.
Greenhead IPA, an India Pale Ale produced by the Newburyport Brewing Company. It is named after the Greenhead fly.

As Green Head
Green Head, Cumbria, England
Green Head, Western Australia